The 1936 Portland Pilots football team was an American football team that represented the University of Portland as an independent during the 1936 college football season. In its tenth and final year under head coach Gene Murphy, the team compiled a 3–4 record. Murphy resigned as Portland's football and baseball coach in December 1936. The team played its home games at Multnomah Stadium in Portland, Oregon.

Schedule

References

Portland
Portland Pilots football seasons
Portland Pilots football
Portland Pilots football